The Berkeley All Blues are a women's rugby union club based in Berkeley, California. They were founded in 1978 and are founding members of the Women's Premier League Rugby. They field three teams throughout the year, in the WPL, Division II, and in Sevens. The All Blues have won a total of 16 National Championships, they include the 2011 and 2012 Women's Premier League Championships and the 2011 and 2013 Women's Club 7s National Championships.

Tournament History

Women's Premier League Rugby

USA Rugby Club 7s

Notable people

References

External links 

 Official site

Women's Premier League Rugby teams
Women's sports in California
Sports in Berkeley, California
Rugby clubs established in 1978
1978 establishments in California